Erce may refer to:

Ercé, a commune in southwestern France
Æcerbot, an Anglo-Saxon metrical charm meant to magically heal dormant fields
Erce Kardeşler, a Turkish footballer